Kandy Kennedy (born 17 February 1996) is an Australian rugby league footballer who plays for the Glebe Dirty Reds in the NSWRL Women's Premiership.

She previously played for the Sydney Roosters in the NRL Women's Premiership.

Background
Born in Sydney, Kennedy was raised in Bathurst, New South Wales. Her father, William, played 61 first grade games for the Balmain Tigers and her brother, William Jr, currently plays for the Cronulla-Sutherland Sharks.

Playing career
In 2013, at 16-years old, Kennedy represented the Indigenous All Stars. In 2014, she again represented the Indigenous All Stars, starting on the  against the Women's All Stars.

In 2017, while representing the Indigenous All Stars for the third time, she tore her anterior cruciate ligament (ACL).

In 2018, she joined the Sydney Roosters NRL Women's Premiership team. In Round 3 of the 2018 NRL Women's season, she made her debut for the Roosters in their 26–0 win over the St George Illawarra Dragons. On 30 September 2018, she came off the bench in the Roosters' Grand Final loss to the Brisbane Broncos.

In 2019 and 2020, she played for the South Sydney Rabbitohs in the NSWRL Women's Premiership.

In 2021, she joined the Glebe Dirty Reds for their inaugural season in the NSWRL Women's Premiership.

References

External links
South Sydney Rabbitohs profile

1996 births
Living people
Indigenous Australian rugby league players
Australian female rugby league players
Rugby league locks
Rugby league players from Sydney
Rugby league wingers
Sydney Roosters (NRLW) players